Hjertsson is a Swedish surname. Notable people with the surname include:

Arne Hjertsson (1918–1987), Swedish footballer
Kjell Hjertsson (1922–2013), Swedish footballer
Sven Hjertsson (1924–1999), Swedish footballer, brother of Arne and Kjell

Swedish-language surnames